Oleg Olegovich Malyukov (born 16 January 1985) is a Russian professional football coach and a former player.

Club career
Despite being on the PFC CSKA Moscow roster for parts of 6 seasons, he only played for the senior team once, in a Russian Premier League Cup game against FC Zenit Saint Petersburg on 29 March 2003.

He played 5 seasons in the Russian Football National League for 5 different teams.

Personal life
He is the son of Oleg Malyukov.

External links
 
 

1985 births
Sportspeople from Omsk
Living people
Russian footballers
Association football defenders
PFC CSKA Moscow players
FC Khimki players
FC Anzhi Makhachkala players
FC Kuban Krasnodar players
FC Salyut Belgorod players
FC Sportakademklub Moscow players
FC Spartak Nizhny Novgorod players